Nacka HK, officially Nacka Hockeyklubb, is a Swedish ice hockey club based in the Stockholm suburb of Nacka.  , Nacka plays in group D of Division 1, the third tier of ice hockey in Sweden.

The club traces its roots to Nacka SK, a sports club founded in 1906 that initially competed in bandy.  Nacka SK's hockey department played 23 seasons in Sweden's top-tier league, most recently the 1971–72 season. However, they never won a Swedish championship. Following their failure to achieve promotion to Elitserien (now the SHL) in the 1976 qualifiers, Nacka SK merged with Atlas Copco IF and Skuru IK to form NSA-76.  The new club renamed itself Nacka HK in 1980.

Mats Sundin, Marcus Ragnarsson, Johan Garpenlöv, Fredrik Lindquist and Leif Svensson are well known players who have played hockey for Nacka HK or its predecessors.

Women's ice hockey
The club won the Swedish championship in 1988, 1989, 1990, 1991, 1992, 1993, 1994, 1996 and 1998. Following the 1997–1998 season, the women's team was disbanded as the players meant the support they got from their club wasn't enough.

In 1985, 1986 and 1987 the club also won the Swedish realm championship for women.

Season-by-season
This is an incomplete list, featuring only recent Nacka SK seasons.

External links
Official website
Profile on Eliteprospects.com

Notes

Ice hockey teams in Sweden
Sport in Stockholm
Ice hockey clubs established in 1980
1980 establishments in Sweden
Ice hockey teams in Stockholm County